Andrey Petrovich Zvyagintsev (born 6 February 1964) is a Russian film director and screenwriter. His film The Return (2003) won him a Golden Lion at the Venice Film Festival. Following The Return, Zvyagintsev directed The Banishment and Elena (2011). His film Leviathan (2014) was nominated for the Academy Award for Best International Feature Film in 2014 and won the Best Film award at the Asia Pacific Screen Awards. His most recent film Loveless won the Jury Prize at the 2017 Cannes Film Festival, and was among the nominees for Best International Feature Film at the 90th Academy Awards. He also won the Achievement in Directing award for this film at the 2017 Asia Pacific Screen Awards.

Life and career
Zvyagintsev was born in Novosibirsk, Siberia. At the age of 20 in 1984, he graduated from the theater school in Novosibirsk as an actor. Since 1986, he has lived in Moscow where he continued his studies at the Russian Institute of Theatre Arts until 1990. From 1992 to 2000, he worked as an actor for film and theater. In 2000, he began to work for the TV station REN TV and directed three episodes of the television series The Black Room.

He directed his first feature film The Return (2003), which received several awards, including a Golden Lion at the Venice Film Festival. His second feature film The Banishment (2007) premiered at its year's Cannes Film Festival and was nominated for a Palme d'Or. This was followed by "Apocrypha" (2008), a short segment for the film New York, I Love You. The segment was eventually cut from the film's theatrical release but is included on the DVD.

Elena (2011), again premiered at Cannes, in the Un Certain Regard section, receiving the festival's Jury Prize.

Leviathan (2014) was selected to compete for the Palme d'Or in the main competition section for its year at Cannes, where Zvyagintsev and Oleg Negin won the award for Best Screenplay for the film. Leviathan won the Golden Globe Award for Best Foreign Language Film and was nominated for the Academy Award for Best International Feature Film. It also won the award for Best Film at the 8th Asia Pacific Screen Awards. In 2015, Zvyagintsev was a jury president of the 18th Shanghai International Film Festival.

His most recent film, Loveless (2017), won the Jury Prize at Cannes in May 2017. It later won the Best Film at the 2017 London Film Festival, making him the second director to have won the award twice, having previously been honored for Leviathan. In November 2017, the film won three awards at the Golden Unicorn Awards in London: Best Film, Best Screenplay, Best Actress. Loveless was also nominated for the Golden Globe Award for Best Foreign Language Film and the Academy Award for Best International Feature Film. Zvyagintsev won the Achievement in Directing award at the 11th Asia Pacific Screen Awards for Loveless. In March 2018, Loveless won the César Award for Best Foreign Film, making Zvyagintsev the first Russian director to have won this award. In 2018, Zvyagintsev was a jury member of the Cannes Film Festival.

Personal life
Andrei Zvyantsev's first wife was actress Irina Grinyova.  They lived together for 6 years, afterwards they divorced.

His second wife is Anna Matveeva, film editor. They have a son, Pyotr (born 2009).

Illness
On June 25, 2021 Zvyagintsev received the Sputnik V COVID-19 vaccine. On the 3rd day after vaccination, he had a fever of 38-39°C and was taken to the hospital. On July 8, he was admitted to intensive care. During his treatment in the hospital, he contracted sepsis as a result of contracting a nosocomial infection resistant to antibiotics. He subsequently developed polyneuropathy after he was put into an artificial coma in Germany, the result of which causing him to lose the ability to walk. For a long time he could neither sit nor speak, and there were problems with the movement of his hands. In the hospital, his throat ligaments were injured. As of May 2022, he is still undergoing treatment at a hospital in Wiesbaden, Germany.

Filmography
 The Black Room (TV series, 2000)
 The Return (2003)
 The Banishment (2007)
 New York, I Love You ("Apocrypha" segment, 2009) – segment cut from theatrical release
 Experiment 5IVE ("Mystery" segment, 2011)
 Elena (2011)
 Leviathan (2014)
 Loveless (2017)

In popular culture 
In Russian dark comedy series The Last Minister Alexander Gorchilin plays an alternate realty version of Zvyagintsev who's kidnapped by a secret government agency and forced to make a sequel to Leviathan as part of a psyop to bolster Russia's reputation as world's bleakest and scariest country.

References

External links

 
 

1964 births
Living people
People from Novosibirsk
Academicians of the National Academy of Motion Picture Arts and Sciences of Russia
Russian Academy of Theatre Arts alumni
Cannes Film Festival Award for Best Screenplay winners
César Award winners
Directors of Golden Lion winners
European Film Awards winners (people)
Recipients of the Nika Award
Male screenwriters
Russian film directors
Russian male writers
Russian screenwriters
Russian activists against the 2022 Russian invasion of Ukraine
Asia Pacific Screen Award winners